Wong Foon Meng is a Malaysian politician and engineer. He is also the former President of the Dewan Negara and a former Terengganu State Assemblyman for the seat of Bandar, Kuala Terengganu from 1995 to 1999.

Early career
Wong was a civil servant in Ministry of Science, Technology and Environment from 1978 to 1990 and later became a Consulting Engineer in 1991 upon leaving the government service.

Political career
Wong made his debut in the 1990 general election by contesting the Bandar, Kuala Terengganu state seat  but lost. He was elected to the Terengganu State Legislative Assembly in the 1995 general election but lost his seat in the subsequent 1999 general election.

He was appointed to the Senate in April 2004, and elected as the Deputy President of the Senate in July the same year. He went on to become Senate President on 7 July 2009. His term ended on 12 April 2010, and he was succeeded by Abu Zahar Ujang.

Wong was the secretary-general for Malaysian Chinese Association (MCA) from 2008 to 2010 when he was picked by the former president Ong Tee Keat then.

Post political personal life
He is currently the Chairman of Bina Puri Holdings Berhad, a Malaysian Main Market public listed company involved in construction, property development, quarrying activities and highway concession.

Election results

Note: a. During 1999 election, the Barisan Nasional (BN) ruled Terengganu state government has also fallen to the Pan-Malaysian Islamic Party (PAS) led Barisan Alternatif coalition.

Honours

Honours of Malaysia
  :
  Companion of the Order of the Defender of the Realm (JMN) (2001)
  Commander of the Order of Loyalty to the Crown of Malaysia (PSM) – Tan Sri (2012)
  :
  Knight Commander of the Order of the Crown of Terengganu (DPMT) – Dato' (2005)

References

Living people
People from Terengganu
Malaysian people of Chinese descent
Malaysian engineers
Malaysian businesspeople
Malaysian Chinese Association politicians
Members of the Terengganu State Legislative Assembly
Members of the Dewan Negara
Presidents of the Dewan Negara
Commanders of the Order of Loyalty to the Crown of Malaysia
Companions of the Order of the Defender of the Realm
21st-century Malaysian politicians
Year of birth missing (living people)
Knights Commander of the Order of the Crown of Terengganu